Rank comparison chart of Non-commissioned officer and enlisted ranks for air forces of Anglophone states.

Officers

References

Military ranks of Anglophone countries
Military comparisons